Salvador Vázquez Ramos (born 8 May 1985) is a former Mexican footballer, who last played as a midfielder for Cruz Azul Hidalgo, in Liga de Ascenso.

Salvador began his career in his home state of Colima, with the Atlante former filial Pegaso Real de Colima. It later became Real Colima. He has also split time at Atlante's current filial, Potros Chetumal.

He made his professional debut on 8 February 2009 in a 1–1 tie with UANL Tigres.

External links
 
 

Living people
1985 births
Association football midfielders
Guerreros de Hermosillo F.C. footballers
Atlante F.C. footballers
Liga MX players
Ascenso MX players
Footballers from Colima
People from Coquimatlán, Colima
Mexican footballers